Pedro Nel Gil (21 October 1927 – 31 March 2021) was a Colombian road cyclist.

References

1927 births
2021 deaths
Colombian male cyclists
Sportspeople from Antioquia Department